Viorica Georgeta Pompilia Moisuc (born 8 April 1934) is a Romanian politician and Member of the European Parliament. Moisuc is a member of the Greater Romania Party, part of the Identity/Sovereignty/Transparency group, and became an MEP on 1 January 2007 with the accession of Romania to the European Union.

External links
European Parliament profile

1934 births
Living people
21st-century Romanian women politicians
Greater Romania Party politicians
Greater Romania Party MEPs
MEPs for Romania 2007
Women MEPs for Romania
21st-century Romanian politicians